West High Street Historic District is a national historic district located at High Point, Guilford County, North Carolina.  The district encompasses 10 contributing buildings and 1 contributing site.  The resources were built between 1879 and 1922 and include six houses, three outbuildings, the Kirkman House garden, and the Kirkman Manufacturing Company (1899).  Located in the district are the separately listed Blair School and O. Arthur Kirkman House and Outbuildings.  Other buildings are the Queen Anne style Annettie Brown House (1897); the Colonial Revival style Fraser-Wilson House (1905) and W. T. Kirkman House (1900); and the brick Colonial Revival / American Craftsman-style O. Arthur Kirkman House (1915).

It was listed on the National Register of Historic Places in 2007.

References

Buildings and structures in High Point, North Carolina
Historic districts on the National Register of Historic Places in North Carolina
Colonial Revival architecture in North Carolina
Queen Anne architecture in North Carolina
National Register of Historic Places in Guilford County, North Carolina